A wedding dress is a clothing worn by a bride during a wedding ceremony.

Wedding dress may also refer to:

Wedding Dress (film), a 2009 South Korean film
"Wedding Dress" (Onyanko Club song), 1987
"Wedding Dress" (Taeyang song), 2009
"Wedding Dress," a song by Mark Lanegan from his album Bubblegum
"Wedding Dress," a song by Derek Webb from his album She Must and Shall Go Free
"Wedding Dress," a song by Sam Amidon from his album All Is Well